Alwyn Job is a Vanuatuan professional football manager.

Career
In 1998, he coached the Vanuatu national football team.

References

External links

Year of birth missing (living people)
Living people
Vanuatuan football managers
Vanuatu national football team managers
Place of birth missing (living people)